Lily Newton (26 January 1893 – 26 March 1981) was professor of botany and vice-principal at the University of Wales.

Early life and education 

Newton was born at Pensford in Somerset in 1893, the daughter of George and Melinda Batten.  She attended Colston’s Girls' School, Bristol, where she was captain of school.  She studied botany at the University of Bristol, where she was awarded the Vincent Stuckey Lean scholarship in botany and graduated with a first class honours degree.

Career 

She became assistant lecturer in Botany at Bristol in 1919, before moving to Birkbeck College, University of London the next year.  She worked as lecturer in botany  until 1923, and then held a research post at the Imperial College of Science until her marriage in 1925. From then until his death in 1927 she assisted him, including visiting the British Museum on his behalf. From 1927 to 1928, she worked for the John Innes Horticultural Institute. 
  
In 1928, Newton moved to Wales, becoming lecturer in botany at the University of Wales, Aberystwyth.  She was promoted to professor of botany in 1930.  Under her guidance, her department achieved a considerable reputation both in Wales and beyond.  There was a striking increase in the number of students, and a vigorous research programme was undertaken, closely related to local issues.  She was Vice-Principal of the University of Wales 1951-52, and then, following the sudden death of Ifor L. Evans,  Acting Principal 1952-53.  In 1959, she was elected Emeritus Professor; she received an honorary LLD from the University of Wales in 1973.  Her students were reported to remembered her as a dedicated teacher, whose lectures were always clear, well illustrated and a model of  succinctness.  She is described as an imposing person and a strict disciplinarian, but also as a kindly person, who would give help when it was needed.  During her time, the  botany department was based on the Promenade.  Although the move to Penglais was made after her retirement, she made a major contribution to the design, equipping  and layout of the new building.
  
She published widely on plant distribution and seaweeds.  Her A Handbook of the British Seaweeds was published in 1931. The majority of it is made up of a systematic treatment of around 750 species of algae, occurring round the coasts of the British Isles.  Jones describes it as a work of outstanding scholarship, still used 50 years later.  During the Second World War, the Ministry of Health was concerned about a possible shortage of agar, essential for scientific, food and medicinal purposes.  This applied particularly after Pearl Harbour when Japanese supplies were cut off.  Newton was asked to coordinate botanical work involving large scale production of agar from suitable British seaweeds.  She served on the Vegetable Drugs Committee of the Ministries of  Supply  and Health.  In addition, she was responsible for the field surveys in Wales and north of the Firth of Lorne, for the work on Gigartina stellata and Chondrus crispus, and for editing the published volume.  
  
Her work on river pollution commenced with an interdisciplinary project on the River Rheidol at Aberystwyth in the 1930s.  Mining operations in the 19th century meant the river was polluted with lead and zinc that adversely affected plant and animal life. The river was monitored until its almost complete recovery as a major salmon river in the late 1960s.  This project is said to have anticipated modern studies in this field by many years.  She was consulted subsequently on the biological effects of pollution in connection with a number of major industrial projects.  She acted as consultant to the Rheidol Hydro-Electric Scheme.
  
She also lectured on fossil and flowering plants, plus playing an important role in the early work of the Nature Conservancy in Wales.
  
Newton held the presidency of a number of societies; these included Section K of the British Association, 1949; the British Phycological Society, 1955–57, and the UK Federation for Education in Home Economics, 1957-63.

Personal life and death 
She married Dr William Charles Frank Newton in 1925, a cytologist at the John Innes Horticultural Institute.  She was widowed two years later.  From 1927 to 1928 she helped to prepare much of her late husband’s work for publication.

Newton died at Pontardawe, near Swansea on 26 March 1981.

Selected publications

Batten, L. 1918. Observations on the ecology of Epilobium hirsutum. J. Ecol., 6: 161-177.

Batten, L. 1923. The genus Polysiphonia, Grev., a critical revision of the British species based upon anatomy. J. Linn. Soc., Botany, 46: 271-311.

Newton, L. A handbook of the British seaweeds. London: British Museum, 1931

Newton, L. Plant distribution in the Aberystwyth district: including Plynlimon and Cader Idris. Aberystwyth: Cambrian News, 1933

Orr, A.P., Newton, L., Marshall, S.M. A study of certain British seaweeds and their utilisation in the preparation of agar. London: HMSO, 1949

Newton, L. Seaweed utilisation. London: Sampson Low, 1951

References

1893 births
1980 deaths
British phycologists
Women phycologists
Welsh women scientists
20th-century Welsh scientists